Drosophila persimilis is a species of fruit fly that is a sister species to D. pseudoobscura, and was one of 12 fruitfly genomes sequenced for a large comparative study.

References

External links 
 Drosophila persimilis at FlyBase
 Drosophila persimilis at Ensembl Genomes Metazoa
 

persimilis
Insects described in 1944